Hafiz Salahuddin Yusuf (Urdu: ‎; 1945, Jaipur, India – 12 July 2020, Lahore, Pakistan) was Pakistani Islamic scholar, Qur'anic commentator, author, researcher, commentator and was former editor-in-chief of Al-Aitisam Weekly (a Pakistani weekly magazine) for twenty four years. He was the head of Darussalam's Research Division department in Lahore.

Early life 
Salahuddin Yusuf was born in 1945 in  Jaipur, India to a religious family. In 1949, his family moved to Pakistan's Hyderabad after the partition of India then shifted to Karachi.

Works 
Salahuddin Yusuf has translated and written several books including Quranic Tafseer in Urdu, Arabic and English. Some of them are:

As author 
 Tafseer Ahsanul-Bayan (Tafseer of Quran) in Urdu, Arabic and English. This was translated by Muhammad Junagarhi and Tafseer was completed by Salahuddin Yusuf.
 Namaz-e-Mohammadi (Urdu) 
 Celebrating of Eid Milad-un-Nabi (Urdu)
 Khilafat o Malokiat Ki Shara'i Hasiat (Urdu)
 Aurton Ke Imtiazi Masail (Urdu)

As Translator 
 Riyadh Al-Saliheen in Urdu Language

Death 
Salahuddin Yusuf died on 12 July 2020 at the age of 75 in Pakistan's Lahore.

References

Bibliography

External links
 Read his books online (Urdu Language)

1945 births
2020 deaths
People from Jaipur
People from Lahore
Pakistani Sunni Muslim scholars of Islam
Muhajir people
Death in Lahore
Ahl-i Hadith people